Zharov is a Russian male surname, its feminine counterpart is Zharova. The surname originated from the word zhar, which means heat and referred to the red hair color. It may refer to:
Aleksandr Zharov (born 1964), Russian politician
Innokenty Zharov (born 1968), Russian Olympic runner
Mikhail Zharov (1899–1981), Russian actor
Vladimir Zharov (born 1949), Russian Olympic rower

References

Russian-language surnames